Carcinarctia is a genus of tiger moths in the family Erebidae. The genus was erected by George Hampson in 1901 and they are found in the Afrotropics.

Species 
 Carcinarctia kivuensis Joicey & Talbot, 1924
 Carcinarctia laeliodes Hampson, 1916
 Carcinarctia laeliodes fasciata Debauche, 1942
 Carcinarctia metamelaena Hampson, 1901
 Carcinarctia rougeoti Toulgoët, 1977
 Carcinarctia rufa (Joicey & Talbot, 1921)

References

External links

Spilosomina
Moth genera